Tranz Rail, formally Tranz Rail Holdings Limited (New Zealand Rail Limited until 1995), was the main rail operator in New Zealand from 1991 until it was purchased by Toll Holdings in 2003.

History

The New Zealand railway network was initially built by provincial governments, starting with the Ferrymead Railway in 1863. From 1880, a central Government department, the New Zealand Railways Department, was responsible for operating most of the growing railway network. A few private lines were built, but only one, the Wellington and Manawatu Railway Company (W&MR) achieved any measure of success. The W&MR was nationalised in 1908. In 1931, due to increasing competition from road carriers, the Transport Licensing Act 1931 was passed, restricting road cartage and giving the railways department a monopoly on long-distance freight. In 1982, the same year the land transport sector was deregulated, the Railways Department was reconstituted as the New Zealand Railways Corporation, a statutory corporation (later a state-owned enterprise from 1986). The Railways Corporation restructured the operations of the railway network substantially during the 1980s, reducing staffing levels, closing workshops, and introducing a number of measures to increase productivity, such as removing guard's vans, increasing train lengths and introducing new, heavier bulk bogie wagons.

Formation 

The Fourth Labour Government passed the New Zealand Railways Corporation Restructuring Act 1990 on 28 August of that year. Two months later, on 28 October 1990, the New Zealand government removed core rail transport and shipping operations from the New Zealand Railways Corporation, creating a separate entity called New Zealand Rail Limited, a Crown Transferee company created under the Act. At the same time, the Rail Heritage Trust of New Zealand was formed to protect heritage assets that New Zealand Rail planned to dispose of, especially heritage rolling stock, stations and other equipment.

The government wrote off NZ$1.08 billion in debt acquired by the company from the Railways Corporation (mainly for the electrification of the North Island Main Trunk, a Think Big project), and injected a further $300 million in capital. Fay, Richwhite and Company, financial advisers New Zealand Rail, argued the company had a better future with minimal debt.

Despite this capital injection, the company remained only marginally profitable, reporting after-tax profits of $36.2 million in 1992 and $18 million in 1993. The Railways Corporation retained ownership of the land beneath the railway tracks and yards, which New Zealand Rail paid $1 per year to lease.

New Zealand Rail re-branded, introducing a new logo similar to the Railways Corporation but with blue and yellow as colours instead of red and black, and a blue livery on locomotives, rolling stock and buildings.

New Zealand Rail 
The Bolger National government, elected following the defeat of the fourth Labour government in elections held in October 1990, privatised New Zealand Rail Limited in 1993. The New Zealand Treasury supported privatisation of the company, even though it stated Fay Richwhite had an unfair advantage over other bidders. Business journalist Brian Gaynor stated that New Zealand Rail was an attractive investment because of its strong balance sheet.

The company was sold for $328.3 million to a consortium named Pylorus Investments Limited, shortly afterwards renamed Tranz Rail Limited. The sale was completed on 30 September 1993. The consortium was made up of Fay Richwhite (31.8% via the investment company Pacific Rail, later renamed Midavia Rail), the American railroad Wisconsin Central (27.3%), Berkshire Partners (27.3%), Alex van Heeren, the owner of Huka Lodge, 9.1% and Richwhite family interests, 4.5%. Tranz Rail Limited raised funds to buy New Zealand Rail by borrowing $223.3 million, and its shareholders contributed $105 million to the acquisition price through the purchase of 105 million Tranz Rail shares at $1 each.

In 1994 the company sold its 15% stake in Clear Communications for $72.6 million, $20.1 million above book value. The company had gained its shareholding by selling its fibre optic network along the North Island Main Trunk to Clear.

Rebranded Tranz Rail

New Zealand Rail carried its corporate brand until 18 October 1995, when Tranz Rail Limited was renamed Tranz Rail Holdings Limited and New Zealand Rail Limited was renamed Tranz Rail. On the same day Tranz Rail Holdings Limited made a $100 million capital repayment to the Fay Richwhite consortium, largely financed by the sale of shares in Clear Communications. The Tranz Rail brand was created by Wellington-based Cato Partners, who also designed brands for the divisions of Tranz Rail:

 CityRail, urban rail commuter services in Auckland and Wellington, were renamed Tranz Metro
 InterCity Rail, long-distance rail passenger services were renamed Tranz Scenic
 RailFreight, rail freight services were renamed Tranz Link

The livery that resulted was nicknamed Cato blue by rail fans.

Initial Public Offering 
Tranz Rail listed on 14 June 1996 on the New Zealand Sharemarket and NASDAQ. 31 million new shares, equivalent to 25% of the company, were issued to the public at $6.19. At the time of the Initial Public Offering (IPO), Tranz Rail had term loans debt of $300 million.

The share price reached $9.00 in the middle of 1997 due to the enthusiasm at the time for rail to have a revitalised future however the ongoing and unsustainable rail infrastructure costs were what failed the company in the end despite aggressive efforts to maintain a sustainable business. The rail traffic and extensive network were simply not sustainable to maintain by a private company in the long term even through Wisconsin Central Transportation were heavily invested in the future of the company. Some of the original Tranz Rail shareholders took advantage of the high share price to sell down their shares in the company. Berkshire Fund sold most of its shares at more than $8 each between November 1996 and March 1997. In 1998, Alex van Heeren sold his holding for a profit of more than $42 million, and the next year Fay Richwhite sold 6.2 million shares at an average $3.67 a share. On 8 February 2002, Fay Richwhite sold 17.6 million shares at $3.60 a share and Berkshire Fund sold 4.3 million shares on 12 February that year at the same price. The original investors made a $360 million profit from their investment.

TasRail investment
In partnership with Wisconsin Central as the Australian Transport Network, Tranz Rail invested in Tasmanian rail operator TasRail in 1997. From 1998 Tranz Rail sold twelve members of its DQ class and three QR class locomotives to TasRail. The locomotives were rebuilt at the Hutt Workshops. The DQ locomotives were originally imported by New Zealand Rail in 1995 from Queensland Rail as an alternative to buying new locomotives. In service they proved unpopular with locomotive crews, due to excessive vibration and noise in their cabs.

The investment provided only marginal returns, and Toll later sold the TasRail shareholding to Pacific National, a Toll Holdings partnership with Patrick Corporation, in 2003.

Asset sales

In December 1996, Tranz Rail sold the DFT class of locomotives to the Chicago Freight Car Leasing Company for $131.5 million. It then leased the locomotives back for a period of 12 years. The lease ended on 19 December 2008 with the locomotives ownership returning to Tranz Rail's successor, KiwiRail.

Tranz Rail's chairman Ed Burkhardt resigned in August 1999 as a result of resigning as the chairman, CEO and president of Wisconsin Central. Industry insiders put this down to his preference to re-invest revenues rather than paying dividends to shareholders. Wisconsin's new board sold the company to the Canadian National Railway on 9 October 2001. Canadian National then put its 24% shareholding in Tranz Rail up for sale.

Tranz Rail also contracted out services which were previously provided in house. Alstom was contracted for locomotive servicing and took over the Hutt Workshops, while Transfield Services took over track maintenance.

In 2001 Tranz Rail sold 50% of Tranz Scenic to two directors of the Victoria, Australia rail operator West Coast Railway for $33 million. This sale included long-distance passenger rolling stock and ten diesel locomotives of the DC class, reclassified as the DCP class, and two EF class electric locomotives. In 2004 this share was purchased by Toll NZ, as one of the West Coast Railway directors had died and the business was not performing adequately.

On 24 December 2001 Tranz Rail sold the Auckland suburban rail network to the New Zealand Government for $81 million. In 2003 a competitive tender was held to find a new operator for the suburban passenger services, which Tranz Rail did not bid for. Connex (later renamed Transdev Auckland) won the contract, and took over Tranz Metro's Auckland operation from 23 August 2004.

Intermodal Transformation Project
Michael Beard became CEO of Tranz Rail in 2000 following the retirement of Dr Francis Small who had led the organisation from its SOE days into its first phase of privatisation. His policy was to focus on the rail freight operation, and sell any assets which were not core to this business, such as long-distance passenger trains (Tranz Scenic) and commuter services in Wellington and Auckland (Tranz Metro), partly because Tranz Rail was running out of cash to fund the rail network maintenance which it had spent over $900 million from 1993-2003. Beard also moved Tranz Rail's headquarters from the Wellington railway station to a new purpose-built office on the North Shore of Auckland, at a cost of $16 million. In 2000 a ministerial inquiry was formed to look into Tranz Rail's safety record, due to an unusually high number of work-related fatalities over the previous 12 months.

Beard introduced a "mode neutral" policy at the same time, as part of his "Intermodal Transformation Project". The project emphasised containerised freight over "marginal" freight, which Tranz Rail stopped carrying by rail. This led to accusations that Tranz Rail was intentionally moving freight off rail and onto roads. One of the reasons cited by Tranz Rail for these policies was the cost of using road transport to the company was less than that of using rail, because the road infrastructure is provided as a public good, whereas the rail network was a private good.

Roger Award
Tranz Rail won the Roger Award for The Worst Transnational Corporation operating in New Zealand on three occasions: 2000, 2001 and 2002, and was the first corporation inducted into the "hall of shame". The Awards came amidst critical reports of lax safety standards, inadequate maintenance, asset stripping and insider trading.

Takeover
In May 2002 Tranz Rail delisted from the NASDAQ, as 70% of its shares were owned by New Zealanders and 16% Australians.

In May 2003, United States based RailAmerica made a takeover offer of 75c per share for Tranz Rail. The offer was later withdrawn when the share price dropped below 50c. In June 2003, the Government announced that it would buy back the rail network for $1 and purchase a 35% stake in the firm for $76 million (67c per share), which would have given it effective control of the company. The Government would have had the right to nominate three of the seven directors on the board. This met with approval from the Rail & Maritime Transport Union (RMTU) which had run a vigorous "Take Back The Track" campaign for the government to renationalise the railway network. The Rail Freight Action Group, which represents the interests of some of the biggest rail freight using companies, declared its support. Tranz Scenic, by then a separate company from Tranz Rail, did likewise.

Toll Holdings offer

In May 2003, the Australian transport firm Toll Holdings purchased a 6.1% share of Tranz Rail, increasing its share to 10.1% by June and 19.9% in July. Toll then launched its own takeover bid, initially offering 75c per share, later increased to 95c.

In July 2003 the Government announced that it was dropping its bid to buy a 35% stake in Tranz Rail, instead allowing Toll to succeed in its takeover bid. Toll's bid valued Tranz Rail at $231 million. The Government reached a Heads of Agreement with Toll later that month, and eventually bought the rail network for $1, plus $50 million for property assets including leases and Wellington railway station. The deal also established a performance regime creating incentives for Toll if it shifts freight from road to rail, and penalties if freight carriage falls below 70% of current levels. If Toll increases freight volumes by 10% or more on certain lines the Government will grant it a track access charge holiday. The parties agreed the Government would spend $200 million over the next five years upgrading the track via the New Zealand Railways Corporation, operating as ONTRACK.

Toll did not achieve the 90% stake of Tranz Rail it required to meet the Government's deal and compulsorily acquire the remaining 10% of shares, despite raising its offer again to $1.10 per share. In 2003, around 3,000 small shareholders held 25% of Tranz Rail's shares, many of them major institutional shareholders such as AMI and Infratil. After a number of extensions of the deadline set by Toll, it held 84.2% of shares in Tranz Rail after the offer closed in December 2003. By that time, shares were being sold on the New Zealand Sharemarket for $1.65, above even the independent valuation of between $1.34 and $1.62 made in July by merchant bankers Grant Samuel. Despite Toll not achieving the 90% requirement, the Government honoured the Heads of Agreement made in July.

In February 2004 Tranz Rail reported a $346 million loss for the half-year ended December 2003. In the same year, it carried 2.1 million tonnes of coal on the Midland line in the South Island. The departure of the former chief executive officer, Michael Beard, and six other top managers cost it $6 million in exit payments.

The company was renamed Toll NZ and did not retain any of the Tranz Rail directors. In May 2008 the New Zealand Government agreed to buy the rail and sea transport assets of Toll NZ Limited for $665 million. The government branded the new company KiwiRail.

Performance

The total number of tonnes transported by New Zealand Rail and Tranz Rail from 1995 increased between 1993 and 2003, peaking in 2000.

Rail freight volumes 19932003 (year ending 30 June):

Securities Commission investigation
In late 2004, the New Zealand Securities Commission launched an investigation into the company regarding alleged insider trading. In June 2007 David Richwhite (along with his shell company Midavia Rail, formerly Pacific Rail) agreed to pay NZ$20 million, but did not admit liability.

See also
 Toll NZ
 KiwiRail

References

Railway companies of New Zealand
New Zealand companies established in 1991
Railway companies established in 1991